"Something's Wrong With Me" is a 1972 song composed by Danny Janssen and Bobby Hart, which became the first major hit single by Austin Roberts. It is a track from his debut album Austin Roberts. 

The song was released as a single on Chelsea Records and reached No. 12 on the Billboard Hot 100 and No. 10 on the Cash Box Top 100 in the United States. In Canada, "Something's Wrong With Me" spent two weeks at No. 6.

Chart performance

References

1972 songs
1972 singles
Austin Roberts (singer) songs
RCA Records singles
Songs written by Bobby Hart